Klaus Glahn (born 23 March 1942) is a retired West German judoka who competed at the 1964 and 1972 Olympics. In 1964 he won a bronze medal in the open weight class while representing the United Team of Germany. Eight years later he won a silver medal for West Germany in the heavyweight category. Between 1967 and 1973 Glahn won five medals at world championships in the heavyweight and open divisions. He also won three European heavyweight titles, in 1963, 1968 and 1970.

From 1985 to 1988 Glahn was president of German Judo Federation. He also worked as a manager at Volkswagen Group.

In the 2000s Glahn was active in politics. He was a leading candidate from the Rentnerinnen- und Rentner-Partei (RRP) at the 2009 European Parliament election.

References

External links

 
 
 
 

1942 births
Living people
German male judoka
Judoka at the 1964 Summer Olympics
Judoka at the 1972 Summer Olympics
Olympic judoka of the United Team of Germany
Olympic judoka of West Germany
Olympic silver medalists for West Germany
Olympic bronze medalists for the United Team of Germany
Olympic medalists in judo
Medalists at the 1972 Summer Olympics
Medalists at the 1964 Summer Olympics
Sportspeople from Hanover